Rod Davison (born 26 June 1969) is an Australian cricketer. He played 39 first-class matches for New South Wales between 1993/94 and 1999/00. Despite a 2000 move to Queensland to try to continue playing first-class cricket, he played no further domestic cricket.

See also
 List of New South Wales representative cricketers

References

External links
 

1969 births
Living people
Australian cricketers
New South Wales cricketers
Cricketers from Sydney